Yoonia is a genus of bacteria from the family of Rhodobacteraceae. Yoonia is named after the microbiologist Jung-Hoon Yoon.

References

Rhodobacteraceae
Bacteria genera